Dyschirius baenningeri is a species of ground beetle in the subfamily Scaritinae. It was described by Fedorenko in 2004.

References

baenningeri
Beetles described in 2004